Rayan Helal (born 21 January 1999) is a French racing cyclist. He rode in the men's sprint event at the 2018 UCI Track Cycling World Championships.

References

External links
 

1999 births
Living people
French male cyclists
French track cyclists
People from Saint-Martin-d'Hères
Cyclists at the 2019 European Games
European Games medalists in cycling
European Games silver medalists for France
Cyclists at the 2020 Summer Olympics
Olympic cyclists of France
Olympic bronze medalists for France
Olympic medalists in cycling
Medalists at the 2020 Summer Olympics
Sportspeople from Isère
Cyclists from Auvergne-Rhône-Alpes
21st-century French people